The 2012 Armor All Bathurst 12 Hour was an endurance race for GT3 cars, GT4 cars, Group 3E Series Production Cars and Dubai 24 Hour cars. The event, which was staged at the Mount Panorama Circuit, near Bathurst, in New South Wales, Australia on 26 February 2012, was the tenth running of the Bathurst 12 Hour, and the sixth since the race was revived in 2007.

There were 25 starters in the race, the smallest field since the inaugural Bathurst 12 Hour event in 1991. Four of the six classes, B, C, E and I, each had only three starters.

The race was won by 2011 Armour All Bathurst 12 Hour winners Darryl O'Young of Hong Kong and Christopher Mies of Germany with their new co-driver for 2012, German Christer Jöns. The trio drove a Phoenix Racing prepared Audi R8 LMS GT3, the same model that Mies and O'Young had driven to victory in 2011.

Class structure
Cars competed in the following six classes.
 Class A – GT3 Outright
 Class B – GT3
 Class C – GT4
 Class D – Production (High Performance)
 Class E – Production (Performance)
 Class I – Invitational

Classes D & E were open to Group 3E Series Production Cars and Class I was for cars complying with the regulations for the 2012 Dubai 24 Hour race.

Qualifying
Two qualifying sessions were run on Saturday 25 February with New Zealand driver Craig Baird setting the fastest time of 2:07.56 in the Clearwater Racing entered Ferrari 458 GT3 and Allan Simonsen next in the Maranello Motorsports Ferrari 458 GT3. However, as grid positions were determined by aggregating the lap times of all drivers in each three-driver entry and the three slowest drivers in each four-driver car, pole position was awarded to the Phoenix Racing entered Audi R8 LMS GT3 of Christer Jöns, Christopher Mies and Darryl O'Young. Simonsen's Ferrari started second on the grid ahead of the Clearwater Racing Ferrari and the Lago Racing Lamborghini Gallardo LP600 of Roger Lago, David Russell and Wayne Park. The Hunter Sports Group Porsche 997 GT3 Cup was the first of the Class B cars in eighth grid position.

The Clearwater Racing Ferrari was forced to carry addition weight during the race as, in a form of parity equalisation, any car undercutting a 2:08 lap time in any pre-race session was levied with a 50 kg penalty.

Two cars were withdrawn before the race. The Consolidated Chemicals Lamborghini Gallardo LP560 was crashed by Ted Huglin during Qualifying and could not be repaired in time for the race and the Mark Bell Racing Ford BF Falcon XR8 did not start after only one of its three drivers had lapped during Practice or Qualifying within the mandatory 130% of the fastest time set during Qualifying.

Race
The Phoenix Racing Audi won by 1 minute and 13 seconds over the Mercedes-Benz SLS AMG jointly run by international team Black Falcon and Australian team Erebus Racing. The Mercedes was driven by Dutch driver Jeroen Bleekemolen, American Bret Curtis and Australians Peter Hackett and Tim Slade. The two leading cars finished two laps ahead of the third placed car, the Clearwater Racing Ferrari 458 GT3 driven by New Zealand driver Craig Baird, Irish driver Matt Griffin and Indonesian driver Weng Sun Mok.

The race was affected by inclement weather, with rain falling for over eight of the races twelve hours, exacting a high price amongst the fastest cars in the race. Of the Class A starters, only the three podium placed cars finished, with crashes eliminating the other two Audis, a second Mercedes and a Lamborghini. The only other car in the class was the Maranello Motorsport Ferrari 458 GT3 which retired early with mechanical problems, but not before the car's lead driver, Dane Allan Simonsen, established a new outright lap record for the Mount Panorama circuit, the first time the record had been held by a GT car.

In fourth place outright, 14 laps behind the Clearwater Ferrari, was the first of the Class B cars, the Porsche 997 GT3 Cup fielded by the Tinkler Motorsports team owned by former mining magnate Nathan Tinkler. Tinkler himself was one of the drivers, joined by professional V8 Supercar drivers Steven Johnson and Steven Richards. They won Class B by ten laps over the similar Porsche of New Zealand team Motorsport Services Limited, driven by Simon McLennan, Brett Niall and Scott O'Donnell.

Class C was won by the Donut King Racing Nissan R35 GT-R driven by Tony Alford, Peter Leemhuis and Adam Beechey. The Nissan finished ten laps ahead of the Lotus Exige of Rob Thomson, Sarah Harley and Austrian driver Christian Klien.

Class D was won by the HSV GTS of James Atkinson, Dean Lillie and Rick Newman. It inherited the class lead after the Maximum Motorsport Subaru Impreza WRX STi of Dean Herridge, John O'Dowd and Angus Kennard suffered a turbocharger failure. The damage was repaired and the Subaru still finished second in class, 11 laps down.

Class E saw the HSV VXR Turbo of Elliot Barbour, Scott Pye, New Zealand V8 Utes racer Chris Pither finishing first in class and seventh outright. The HSV finished 13 laps ahead of the second placed GWS Personnel Motorsport BMW 130i driven by Angus Chapel, Richard Gartner and Tony Prior, and nine laps ahead of the first Class D car.

Class I saw only two classified finishers with the Dutch SEAT León TDI of Ivo Breukers, Henk Thijssen and Australian driver Martin Bailey winning the class and finishing in sixteenth position outright, over 100 laps behind the winning Audi. A pair of Mazda RX-7s completed the class with one retiring after 53 laps and the other still running at the finish but having completed only 82 laps.

Official results

 Note: Class winners are shown in Bold
 Race time of winning car: 12:03:31.3753  
 Fastest race lap: 2:06.3311 – Car 17 – New outright lap record

References

External links
 Official website
 Armor All Bathurst 12 Hour - 24th to 26th February 2012 - 12 Hour Event Supplementary Regulations, www.bathurst12hour.com.au, as archived at www.webcitation.org
 2012 Armor All Bathurst 12 Hour Entry List as at 24/01/12, www.bathurst12hour.com.au, as archived at www.webcitation.org
 2012 Results, www.bathurst12hour.com.au, as archived at web.archive.org
 Reflections on the 2012 Bathurst 12 Hour, www.ausmotive.com, as archived at web.archive.org

Motorsport in Bathurst, New South Wales
Armor All Bathurst 12 Hour
February 2012 sports events in Australia